Mark Slatten Snyder (August 14, 1946 – September 22, 2020) was an American businessman and politician.

Snyder was born in Edmond, Oklahoma and graduated from Edmond High School. He received his bachelor's degree in hotel and restaurant administration from Oklahoma State University. He served in the United States Army during the Vietnam War and was commissioned a captain. He operated his family business: Snyder Hardware, in Edmond. Snyder served on the Edmond City Council and was a Republican. Snyder served in the Oklahoma Senate from 1988 until 2002. He died in Edmond, Oklahoma.

Notes

1946 births
2020 deaths
People from Edmond, Oklahoma
Military personnel from Oklahoma
Oklahoma State University alumni
Businesspeople from Oklahoma
Oklahoma city council members
Republican Party Oklahoma state senators